

This is a timeline of the history of Quebec City.

16th century
 1535 - Jacques Cartier arrived and later winters in the village of Stadacona

17th century
1608 – L'Habitation (Quebec City) was founded by Samuel de Champlain, near the ruins of Stadacona.
1615 – The first missionaries, the Recollets, arrived in the city. 
1629-32 – the city briefly passed into possession of the English. 
1629 – The Recollets left New France but returned in 1670. 
1632 – Treaty of Saint-Germain-en-Laye (1632). 
1635 – The Jesuits arrived and found the Collège de Québec. 
1636 – Charles Huault de Montmagny became the settlement’s governor, who presided over expansion of the settlement and construction of its first church, Notre Dame de la Paix. 
1639 – The Ursulines arrived; Ecole des Ursulines, Quebec established. 
1639 – The Augustines arrived; Hôtel-Dieu de Québec founded by Augustinians. It was administered by the Augustinian order until 1962. 
1647 – The first Notre-Dame de Québec Cathedral constructed. 
1648 – The first Chateau St. Louis was built under the direction of Charles de Montmagny. 
1663 – Quebec became the capital city of New France, the population of Quebec and its surrounding farm lands had reached 1,950 people. 
1663 – Petit Séminaire of Quebec founded. 
1687-1723 – Notre-Dame-des-Victoires constructed. 
1690 – The Battle of Quebec (1690) during King William's War. 
1693-95 – Old Parliament Building (Quebec) built.

18th century
1711 – Quebec Expedition. 
1726 – Claude-Thomas Dupuy commissioned Claude Barolet as royal notary for Quebec City 
1754-63 – French and Indian War was the North American chapter of the Seven Years' War, known in Quebec as the War of the Conquest. 
1758 – Siege of Louisbourg (1758). 
1759 – Battle of Beauport. 
1759 – In the Battle of the Plains of Abraham, the city was permanently lost by the French. 
1760 – Battle of Sainte-Foy and Siege of Quebec (1760)
1763 – Treaty of Paris. France formally ceded its claims to Canada, and Quebec City's French-speaking, Catholic population was under the rule of Protestant Britain. 
1774 – The Quebec Act. 
1775 – Battle of Quebec (1775). 
1789 – The theater company Les Jeunes Messieurs Canadiens is inaugurated.
1791 – The Constitutional Act of 1791. 
1791 – Anglican Diocese of Quebec created.

19th century
1804 – Holy Trinity Anglican Cathedral completed. 
1807 – The construction of St. Andrew's Church (Quebec City) began. 
1805-63 – Quebec Mercury published. 
1819 – Roman Catholic Archdiocese of Quebec established. 
1820 – The construction of the Citadelle of Quebec began. 
1824 – Literary and Historical Society of Quebec founded. 
1840 – La Maison Simons founded. 
1845 – Quebec City fires
1848 – Institut canadien de Québec founded. 
1848 – The last Canadian Récollet Brother Louis died at Quebec City. 
1850s – Quebec Skating Rink opened. 
1855 – Brunet (pharmacy) founded. 
1857-59 – Cimetière Notre-Dame-de-Belmont constructed. 
1862 – Morrin College founded; it is located at Morrin Centre. 
1864 – Quebec Conference, 1864. 
1877-86 – Parliament Building (Quebec) constructed. 
1879 – Old Quebec Funicular opened. 
1885 – Saint-Jean-Baptiste Church constructed. 
1885-88 – Quebec City Armoury built. 
1889 – Quebec rockslide. 
1893 – Château Frontenac opened. 
1896 – Le Soleil founded. 
1900 – Desjardins Group founded.

20th century
1902 – Orchestre Symphonique de Québec founded. 
1908 – Plains of Abraham Park became the first historic site to be protected by the federal government, acting as a catalyst for the establishment of the National Historic Site of Canada system in 1919
1912 – Quebec Boundaries Extension Act, 1912. 
1915 – Gare du Palais built. 
1917 – The construction of the Quebec Bridge, connecting the North and South banks of the St. Lawrence River, was finished. 
1926 – Basilica of Sainte-Anne-de-Beaupré built. 
1928 – Quebec Aces founded. 
1930-31 – Édifice Price constructed in Old Quebec. 
1931 – Édifice Jean-Antoine-Panet built. 
1933 – Musée national des beaux-arts du Québec. 
1935-37 – Édifice André-Laurendeau was built. 
1939 – Québec City Jean Lesage International Airport established. 
1943 – Quebec Conference, 1943; Quebec Agreement. 
1944 – Second Quebec Conference. The conferences were held at the Citadel and nearby Château Frontenac. 
1944 – Université du Québec established. 
1955 – Quebec Winter Carnival established. 
1968 – Quebec City Summer Festival established. 
1969 – École nationale d'administration publique and Institut national de la recherche scientifique established. 
1971 – Grand Théâtre de Québec opened, features l'Orchestre Symphonique de Quebec and concertmaster Hidetaro Suzuki. 
1972 – Edifice Marie-Guyart completed. 
1984 – Opération Nez rouge was founded in Quebec City. 
1984 – Musée de la civilisation established. 
1985 – Ramparts of Quebec City was declared a World Heritage site by UNESCO. 
1985 – Shamrock Summit. 
1987 – Flag of Quebec City adopted. 
1994 – Quebec Biker war. 
1995 – Centre hospitalier universitaire de Québec created. 
1998 – Quebec City International Festival of Military Bands.

21st century
2001 – 3rd Summit of the Americas. 
2001 – Capitale-Nationale played host to a major world sporting event, the World Police and Fire Games, which was a success for the city, with as many as 11,000 athletes and 14,000 persons accompanying them, making 25,000 persons in total. 
2002 – Communauté métropolitaine de Québec created. 
2002 – Quebec City Military Tattoo created. 
2008 – The 400th anniversary of the founding.
2017 - Quebec City mosque shooting.

See also
 
Timeline of Quebec history 
List of years in Canada

Articles which contain graphical timelines
 Timeline
Timelines of cities in Canada
Timelines of Quebec history